Daniel "Dani" Chigou (born 5 July 1983) is a Cameroonian former professional footballer who played as a striker. In a journeyman career, he played for numerous clubs in Italy, Romania, Hungary, the Czech Republic and Russia. He has been compared to fellow Cameroonian striker Samuel Eto'o.

Career

Italy
He played for eight clubs in Italy in a period of seven years. He began his football career in the 2001–02 season in the Italian Serie B with Ternana Calcio, where he played twice without scoring. After moving on, he represented clubs in Serie C1 and Serie C2.

Czech Republic

In January 2009, Chigou signed for Czech club FK Dukla Prague from Hungarian side Debrecen. He made his first appearance for Dukla in a friendly match against SV Wacker Burghausen on 17 January 2009, scoring two goals. He opened his account in his second competitive game for the club, scoring a hat-trick as Dukla defeated Fotbal Fulnek by a club record score, 6–0.

In the 2009–2010 season he scored 14 goals, becoming the top goalscorer of the Czech 2. Liga together with Pavel Černý and Karel Kroupa.

Chigou started the following season, the 2010–11 Czech 2. Liga, by scoring six goals in five matches and again finished the season as the division's top scorer, this time outright, with 19 goals for FK Dukla Prague. Following the end of the 2010–11 season, Chigou decided not to extend his contract and left the club.

In July 2011, Chigou had a trial at Belgian First Division club Oud-Heverlee Leuven. However Chigou was not offered a contract and found himself back at Dukla at the beginning of the 2011–12 Gambrinus liga to train with the club, watching the opening game of the season against Olomouc. On 25 August 2011 it was announced he had started training at Russian First Division outfit FC Volgar-Gazprom Astrakhan.

In February 2012, Chigou returned to the Czech Republic, signing once more for Dukla, but immediately going on loan to Czech 2. Liga side FC Zbrojovka Brno.

Chigou returned to Dukla in the summer of 2012 but did not feature for the first team in the first half of the season. In February 2013 he had a trial at second division 1. SC Znojmo. Despite scoring in a 4–1 friendly win against Austrian third division side Retz, Znojmo manager Leoš Kalvoda decided against signing the player.

Career statistics

Statistics accurate as of match played 30 June 2012

Honours

Club

 FK Dukla Prague
 Czech 2. Liga: 2011

Individual 

 Czech 2. Liga top goalscorer: 2010 (shared), 2011

References

External links 
 
 

1983 births
Living people
Cameroonian footballers
Liga I players
Serie B players
S.S. Virtus Lanciano 1924 players
Expatriate footballers in Hungary
S.S. Fidelis Andria 1928 players
Expatriate footballers in Italy
FK Dukla Prague players
FC Zbrojovka Brno players
Expatriate footballers in Romania
S.S.C. Giugliano players
Expatriate footballers in the Czech Republic
A.S.D. Paternò 1908 players
Cameroonian expatriate sportspeople in Hungary
A.C. Legnano players
Cameroonian expatriate sportspeople in Romania
S.S.D. Sanremese Calcio players
Cameroonian expatriate sportspeople in Italy
Nuorese Calcio players
Cameroonian expatriate sportspeople in the Czech Republic
FCV Farul Constanța players
Cameroonian expatriate footballers
FCM Câmpina players
Association football forwards
Debreceni VSC players
Ternana Calcio players
Mount Cameroon F.C. players
Expatriate footballers in Russia
FC Volgar Astrakhan players